Nebria korgei is a species of ground beetle in the Nebriinae subfamily that is endemic to Turkey.

References

korgei
Beetles described in 1965
Beetles of Asia
Endemic fauna of Turkey